The Chibouet river is a tributary of the Yamaska River. It flows north-east in the municipalities of Saint-Nazaire-d'Acton (MRC d 'Acton Regional County Municipality), Sainte-Hélène-de-Bagot and Saint-Hugues in the Les Maskoutains Regional County Municipality (MRC), in the administrative region of Montérégie, on the South Shore of Saint Lawrence River, in Quebec, Canada.

Geography 

The main neighboring hydrographic slopes of the Chibouet River are:
 North side: David River, stream number Three, Chènes stream;
 East side: Rivière le Renne, Duncan River;
 South side: Cournoyer-Lajoie stream, rivière La Cavée, rivière le Renne;
 West side: Yamaska River.

The Chibouet River originates from a set of agricultural streams draining the area of the hamlet of Royville, located west of the hamlet of Duncan, that is to say south of highway 20, in the municipality of Saint-Nazaire-d'Acton, in the Acton Regional County Municipality (MRC). This area is located to the south-east of the village of Sainte-Hélène-de-Bagot and to the west of the village of Saint-Nazaire-d'Acton.

Upper course south of highway 20 (segment of )

At from this confluence, the river flows in an agricultural zone on:
  south to the Gilas-Boucher stream;
  southwesterly to rang Sainte-Hélène road;

Course north of highway 20 ( segment)

From Highway 20, the Chibouet River flows over:
  north-west to the Belval stream;

Course west of chemin du 3e rang (segment of )

From the 3e rang road, the Chibouet river flows over:

Toponymy 

The old name of this river was "Sciebouette".

The toponym "Rivière Chibouet" was officially registered on December 5, 1968, at the Commission de toponymie du Québec.

See also 

 Yamaska River, a watercourse
 Rivière le Renne, a stream
 Saint-Hugues, a municipality
 Sainte-Hélène-de-Bagot, a municipality
 Saint-Nazaire-d'Acton, a municipality
 Acton Regional County Municipality (MRC)
 List of rivers of Quebec

References 

Rivers of Montérégie
Les Maskoutains Regional County Municipality